Bianor is a genus of boreal jumping spiders that can grow to . The robust shiny body and northerly distribution are distinctive. Males can be easily recognized by his swollen forelegs and females have orange legs. It was first described by George and Elizabeth Peckham in 1886, who names it after the mythical son of Hercules.

Species
 it contains twenty-eight species:
Bianor albobimaculatus (Lucas, 1846) — Africa, Mediterranean to Russia (Europe), Azerbaijan, Kazakhstan, Central Asia, Pakistan, India
Bianor angulosus (Karsch, 1879) — India, Sri Lanka, Bhutan, Bangladesh, China, Myanmar, Vietnam, Thailand, Malaysia, Indonesia
Bianor balius Thorell, 1890 — India, Sri Lanka, Bhutan, China, Japan (Ryukyu Is.), Thailand, Cambodia, Malaysia, Indonesia, Kiribati (Caroline Is.)
Bianor biguttatus Wesolowska & van Harten, 2002 — Yemen (Socotra)
Bianor biocellosus Simon, 1902 — Brazil
Bianor compactus (Urquhart, 1885) — New Zealand
Bianor concolor (Keyserling, 1882) — Australia (New South Wales)
Bianor diversipes Simon, 1901 — Malaysia
Bianor eximius Wesolowska & Haddad, 2009 — Zimbabwe, South Africa
Bianor fasciatus Mello-Leitão, 1922 — Brazil
Bianor hongkong Song, Xie, Zhu & Wu, 1997 — China (Hong Kong)
Bianor kovaczi Logunov, 2001 — Ivory Coast, Ethiopia, Botswana
Bianor maculatus (Keyserling, 1883) — Australia, New Zealand
Bianor monster Zabka, 1985 — Vietnam
Bianor murphyi Logunov, 2001 — Kenya
Bianor narmadaensis (Tikader, 1975) — India
Bianor nexilis Jastrzebski, 2007 — Bhutan
Bianor pashanensis (Tikader, 1975) — India
Bianor paulyi Logunov, 2009 — Madagascar, Comoros
Bianor piratus Sen, Dhali, Saha & Raychaudhuri, 2015 — India
Bianor pseudomaculatus Logunov, 2001 — India, Bhutan, Cambodia, Vietnam
Bianor punjabicus Logunov, 2001 — Afghanistan, Pakistan, India
Bianor quadrimaculatus (Lawrence, 1927) — Namibia
Bianor senegalensis Logunov, 2001 — Senegal
Bianor simplex (Blackwall, 1865) — Cape Verde Is.
Bianor tortus Jastrzebski, 2007 — India, Nepal
Bianor vitiensis Berry, Beatty & Prószyński, 1996 — Fiji
Bianor wunderlichi Logunov, 2001 — Canary Is., Azores

References

Further reading
 Logunov, D.V. (2001): A redefinition of the genera Bianor Peckham & Peckham, 1885 and Harmochirus Simon, 1885, with the establishment of a new genus Sibianor gen. n. (Araneae: Salticidae). Arthropoda Selecta 9(4): 221-286.

External links
 Photograph of B. albobimaculatus

Salticidae
Salticidae genera
Cosmopolitan spiders